The Phi Beta Kappa Award in Science is given annually by the Phi Beta Kappa Society to authors of significant books in the fields of science and mathematics. The award was first given in 1959 to anthropologist Loren Eiseley.

Award winners
Source: Phi Beta Kappa Society
2022 - Chanda Prescod-Weinstein

See also 

 List of general science and technology awards 
 Ralph Waldo Emerson Award

References

American non-fiction literary awards